This article lists the albums and singles attributed to the anime series Heat Guy J.

Soundtrack albums

Heat Guy J: Original Soundtrack – Burn 

Heat Guy J: Original Soundtrack – Burn is the sole soundtrack album of Heat Guy J, released by Lantis on December 25, 2002, and by Pioneer Entertainment in the U.S. on August 19, 2003. It contains the background music composed and performed by Try Force, a side project of Japanese singer-songwriter Hironobu Kageyama. The U.S. version replaces the first ending theme "Kokoro no Sukima" by WYSE with the second ending theme "Hikari" by Saeko Chiba.

Track listing

Personnel
Try Force
 Hironobu Kageyama – lead vocals, guitar
 Kenichi Sudoh – keyboards, backing vocals
 Yohgo Kohno – guitar, keyboards, backing vocals
 Yoshichika Kuriyama – synthesizers

WYSE
 Tsukimori – lead vocals
 Takuma – bass, backing vocals
 Hiro – guitar
 Mori – guitar
 Kenji – drums

Singles

"Face"

"Face" is the first single for Heat Guy J by Try Force, released by Lantis on October 23, 2002. It features the series opening theme, plus the image song "Inside Touch".

Track listing

"Hikari"

 is the second single for Heat Guy J and the sixth single by Japanese voice actress and singer Saeko Chiba, released by Lantis on January 22, 2003. Written and produced by Yuki Kajiura, the song was the series' ending theme from episodes 14 to 25. Chiba also voiced Kyoko Milchan in the series.

The single peaked at No. 163 on Oricon's weekly singles chart.

Track listing

Charts

Footnotes

References

External links
  (Lantis)

Heat Guy J: Original Soundtrack – Burn
 
 

"Face" single
 
 

"Hikari" single
 
 

2002 soundtrack albums
Anime soundtracks
Lantis (company) soundtracks